Tang-e Fariab (also Romanized as Tang-e Fārīāb and Tang-e Fāreyāb) is a village in Eram Rural District, Eram District, Dashtestan County, Bushehr Province, Iran. At the 2006 census, its population was 332, in 68 families.

References 

Populated places in Dashtestan County